 
Salentin IX of Isenburg-Grenzau (German: Salentin IX. von Isenburg-Grenzau) (c. 1532–1610) was the Archbishop-Elector of Cologne as "Salentin of Isenburg" from 1567 until 1577, the Bishop of Paderborn from 1574 until 1577, and the Count of Isenburg-Grenzau from 1577 to 1610.

Biography

Early life
Salentin IX was the second son of Count Henry of Isenburg-Grenzau. As his parents did not have the money to educate all three of their sons, the elder two, John and Salentin, were chosen and sent to the cathedral of Mainz in 1548. In 1558 he became a member of the cathedral of Cologne. When his younger brother Anthony died in 1563, his elder brother John left the church and returned to Isenburg-Grenzau. In 1565 he obtained office in St. Gereon in Cologne, and also in that year John died.

Although often named Salentin VI, VII, or VIII, he is correctly named Salentin IX: Salentin VI was the count of Lower-Isenburg (German: Graf von Nieder-Isenburg), (born ~1370, died after 1458), Salentin VII was the lord of Isenburg and Neumagen (German: Herr von Isenburg und Neumagen) and founder of the last Isenburg-Grenzau line, born before 1492, died after 24 September 1534, and Salentin VIII was the 2nd son of Salentin VII.

Archbishop of Cologne and Bishop of Paderborn
On 23 December 1567 he was elected the Archbishop of Cologne. He did not have priestly consecrations as he intended to leave the church and take up rulership of the County of Isenburg-Grenzau in the foreseeable future, a condition which had the support of the cathedral chapter and the Holy Roman Emperor but not Pope Pius V, who demanded a new election was to take place. However Pius V died in 1572 and his successor, Gregory XIII, confirmed the election the following year.

As the archbishop of Cologne, Salentin used its resources to improve the conditions in Isenburg-Grenzau, and succeeded in obtaining for it the status imperial immediacy in the Bench of Counts of the Wetterau. On 21 April 1574 he was also elected the Bishop of Paderborn and received papal confirmation. On 9 December he arrived in splendour at Paderborn surrounded by thousands of attendants. During his reign he reorganised the administration and the finances of the dioceses. He retired from the Bishopric of Paderborn on 5 September 1577 and the Archbishopric of Cologne eight days later.

Later life
Salentin succeeded Count Arnold in Isenburg-Grenzau. On 10 December 1577, he married Antonia Wilhelmina of Arenberg, the sister of Charles de Ligne, 2nd Prince of Arenberg. He had two sons, Salentin X and Ernest I and both, like their father, had successful military careers.  Salentin died on 19 March 1610 and was buried in the praemonestrian Rommersdorf.

References

1530s births
1610 deaths
Year of birth uncertain
People from Neuwied (district)
Salentin 01
Salentin 01
Salentin 01
16th-century German Roman Catholic bishops
House of Isenburg
Prince-Bishops of Paderborn
16th-century bishops in the Holy Roman Empire